Thornham is a town in the local municipality of Kou-Kamma, in Sarah Baartman District Municipality in the Eastern Cape province of South Africa.

References

Populated places in the Kou-Kamma Local Municipality